Morris Eugène Smith (February 16, 1912 – May 8, 2005) was an American amateur tennis player in the 1930s and 1940s.

Tennis career
Smith reached the quarterfinals of Wimbledon in 1939 and won the Canadian International Championships in 1935.

References

External links

Wimbledon Results Archive

1912 births
2005 deaths
American male tennis players
People from San Luis Obispo, California